Prosperity was launched in Strangford in 1788. She traded in the area and then to Dominica. From 1792 she made two voyages as a slave ship in the Atlantic triangular slave trade. On both voyages French privateers captured her. In the first case the Royal Navy recaptured her and she completed her voyage. In the second case her captor sent her into France.

Career
Prosperity first appeared in Lloyd's Register (LR), in 1789.

Capture (1793): Captain Richard Kelsall sailed from Liverpool on 3 November 1792.

 recaptured Prosperity, which arrived at Barbados.

Capture (1794): Captain Kelsall sailed from Liverpool on 14 August 1794.

In December 1794, Lloyd's List reported that Prosperity, Kelsall, master, from Liverpool to Africa, had been captured and taken to France. The capture took place before Prosperity had embarked any slaves.

Notes

Citations

References
 

1788 ships
Age of Sail merchant ships of England
Liverpool slave ships
Captured ships